The Moskalyev SAM-7 Sigma was a one-off, Soviet, experimental tailless fighter aircraft.

Design and development

As early as 1933, Aleksandr Moskalyev was designing a rocket-powered, tailless aircraft with an ogival or gothic delta wing, wingtip fins and rudders, which would be able to fly faster than sound. Because no sufficiently powerful engines were available at the time, the Moskalyev SAM-4 Sigma never left the drawing board but it did lead to two interim types, the SAM-7 Sigma and SAM-9 Strela.

The all-metal Sigma was intended to investigate the manoeuvrability and field of fire of a two seat, tailless, wingtip finned fighter aircraft, using a less radical low aspect ratio, trapezoidal plan wing. This low wing had two spars and trailing edges carrying inboard elevators and outboard ailerons. The fins bore balanced rudders; six Soviet diagrams show different profiles and no photographs of the completed Sigma are known.

The Sigma was powered by a  V-12 Mikulin AM-34 engine mounted ahead of the wing leading edge and driving a four blade, wooden propeller. At high speeds it was cooled with surface radiators, supplemented at low speed by a retractable radiator.  The pilot sat over mid chord in an enclosed cockpit. The fuselage ended behind the trailing edge with a glazed and enclosed position for the rear gunner. 

It had conventional, retractable landing gear with single landing legs hinging inward on the forward spars. There was a small, semi-recessed tailwheel in the extreme rear fuselage. 

The Sigma was first flown in October 1935.

Specifications (performance estimated)

References

Single-engined tractor aircraft
1930s Soviet experimental aircraft
Moskalyev aircraft
Soviet inventions
Russian inventions